Sellest mustast mungast is a novel by Estonian author Gert Helbemäe. It was first published in 1957.

Estonian novels
1957 novels